Dunbible is a town located in north-eastern New South Wales, Australia, in the Tweed Shire.

Demographics

The median age of the Dunbible population was 43 years, 6 years above the national median of 37.

83.3% of people living in Dunbible were born in Australia. The other top responses for country of birth were England 1.8%, India 1.8%, Taiwan 1.2%, Netherlands 1.2%, Germany 0.9%.

87.9% of people spoke only English at home; the next most common languages were 3.9% Punjabi, 1.2% Mandarin, 0.9% German.

References 

Suburbs of Tweed Heads, New South Wales